Douglas Júnior da Silva Negreiros (born 15 October 1988), simply known as Douglas Júnior, is a Brazilian born Kazakhstani futsal player who plays for MFK KPRF and the Kazakhstan national futsal team as a forward.

Honours
UEFA Futsal Champions League runner-up: 2018–19

References

External links
AFC Kairat profile
The Final Ball profile

1988 births
Living people
Futsal defenders
Futsal forwards
Brazilian men's futsal players
Kazakhstani men's futsal players
Brazilian expatriate sportspeople in the Czech Republic
Brazilian expatriate sportspeople in Kazakhstan
Brazilian emigrants to Kazakhstan
Naturalised citizens of Kazakhstan